Lucas Arnold Ker and Mariano Hood successfully defended their title by defeating Gastón Etlis and Martín Rodríguez 7–5, 6–2 in the final. Arnold Ker won the tournament for the third year in a row.

Seeds

Draw

Draw

References

External links
 Main draw (ATP)
 ITF tournament profile

Campionati Internazionali di Sicilia
2004 ATP Tour
Camp